Darktown is the 14th studio album from British Musician Steve Hackett, released in 1999. It was reissued in 2013 with 3 bonus tracks. On some copies of this reissue, the title was misspelled as "Darktwon" on the sides of the CD case.

Darktown is the last album to feature Julian Colbeck as a keyboardist, on the title track only. Colbeck had played with Hackett for much of the 1990s. Darktown shows the increasing role that Roger King would play as a part of Hackett's band, as a producer and keyboardist and later as a co-writer.

Track listing
All songs written by Steve Hackett, except indicated.
"Omega Metallicus" – 3:48
"Darktown" – 4:59
"Man Overboard" – 4:17
"The Golden Age of Steam" – 4:09
"Days of Long Ago" (Hackett, Diamond) – 3:23
"Dreaming with Open Eyes" – 6:54
"Twice Around the Sun" – 7:15
"Rise Again" – 4:26
"Jane Austen's Door" – 6:13
"Darktown Riot" – 3:10
"In Memoriam" – 7:59

1999 Japanese bonus tracks
"The Well At The World's End" (Instrumental) – 3:52
"Comin' Home To The Blues" – 6:12 Japan Edition

2013 Reissue bonus tracks
"Flame" – 4:21
"Coming Home to the Blues" – 6:13
"Fast Flower" – 4:32

"Flame" had previously been released on the Japanese edition of Hackett's 2003 album To Watch the Storms, "Coming Home to the Blues" on the Japanese edition of Darktown and "Fast Flower" on the Japanese edition of Hackett's 2009 album Out of the Tunnel's Mouth.

Personnel
 Billy Budis – cello
 Julian Colbeck – keyboards
 Hugo Degenhardt – drums
 Jim Diamond – vocals
 Ben Fenner – mellotron
 Bob Fenner – guitar, recorder
 Aron Friedman – piano, keyboards
 John Hackett – flute, pan pipes
 Steve Hackett – guitar, harmonica, piano, strings, violin, vocals, choir, chorus, 12 string guitar, woodwind, rainstick, sequencing, orchestration, 12-string bass guitar, nylon string guitar, voiceover
 Roger King – bass, drums, flageolet, keyboards, woodwind, wood
 Ian McDonald – saxophone
 Jerry Peal – strings, bells, woodwind
 Doug Sinclair – bass, fretless bass
 John Wetton – bass samples

Production
Richard Buckland – engineer, ambience
Billy Budis – engineer, mixing, management
Paul Cox – photography, portrait photography
Jamie McKena – choir coordinator
Harry Pearce – photography
Lippa Pearce – design

References

External links
 

1999 albums
Steve Hackett albums
Inside Out Music albums